Babiak may refer to:

Places
Babiak, Koło County in Greater Poland Voivodeship (west-central Poland)
Babiak, Turek County in Greater Poland Voivodeship (west-central Poland)
Babiak, Warmian-Masurian Voivodeship (north Poland)

People with the surname
Miron Babiak (1932–2013), Polish sailor
Todd Babiak, Canadian writer